Travailleur socialiste ('Socialist Worker') was a French language weekly newspaper published from Pointe-à-Pitre, Guadeloupe. Travailleur socialiste was founded in 1934. It was an organ of SFIO. As of 1937, Paul Valentin was the political director of the publication.

References

French-language newspapers published in North America
Newspapers published in Guadeloupe
1934 establishments in Guadeloupe
Socialist newspapers
Publications established in 1934